The Piano Quartet in B major, Op. 41, also known as the Piano Quartet No. 2, was written by Camille Saint-Saëns in February 1875. Dedicated to Jules Foucault, it was premiered on 6 March 1875 in Paris. It has been called one of Saint-Saëns' neglected masterpieces and is in the core repertoire of the piano quartet.

History 

The Piano Quartet in B major is preceded by a Piano Quartet in E major, which Saint-Saëns had written more than 20 years earlier, but remained unpublished until 1992. The Piano Quartet in B major was written in February 1875, an eventful year that marked his marriage to Marie-Laure Truffot and the birth of his son André, the composition of Le Déluge and the fourth piano concerto, and the premiere of Danse macabre.

The work was dedicated to Jules Foucault and was premiered on 6 March 1875 at Salle Pleyel with the composer on the piano, Pablo de Sarasate (violin), Alfred Turban (viola), and Léon Jacquard (cello). It has been arranged for piano duet by Auguste Horn (1877) and for two pianos by Jules Griset (1910).

Structure 

The piano quartet consists of four movements, which are cyclical in nature.

Legacy 
Jeremy Nicholas has called the Piano Quartet a neglected masterpiece, alongside the Septet and the Violin Sonata No. 1. Today it is part of the standard repertoire of the piano quartet.

References

External links 
 

Chamber music by Camille Saint-Saëns
Saint-Saens 2
1875 compositions
Compositions in B-flat major
Music with dedications